Bring It Down is the debut album by New York City-based alternative rock band Madder Rose. It was released in 1993 on Seed Records, an alternative-oriented subsidiary of Big Beat Records, and was produced by Kevin Salem. In the United Kingdom, the album was released by Revolver Distribution, and its song "Swim" was released as an import single there. "Swim" increased the band's popularity in the UK thanks to the single's promotion by John Peel of the BBC. As of March 5, 1994, the album had sold 10,000 copies in the UK.

Reception
Bring it Down received mainly positive reviews upon its release, and prompted many British critics to proclaim Madder Rose as the second coming of the Velvet Underground. The album's title track was named the 27th best song of 1993 by NME. It has been described, retrospectively, as "an amalgam of driving beats, searing guitars, and sweet vocals." Another favorable retrospective assessment came from Everett True, who wrote in 2009 that the album was "pretty gorgeous". In addition, in a favorable review, Rachel Felder compared Madder Rose's guitar sound to that of Dinosaur Jr. and My Bloody Valentine. However, some critics, such as Peter Margasak, criticized the album for sounding too much like typical indie rock.

Track listing
 Beautiful John
 While Away
 Bring It Down
 20 Foot Red
 Swim
 Lay Down Low
 Altar Boy
 Lights Go Down
 (Living A) Daydream
 Sugarsweet
 Razor Pilot
 Waiting For Engines
 Pocket Fulla Medicine

Personnel
Alan Bezozi-Drum Programming
Diane Carpentieri-Design
Billy Coté	-Bass, Composer, Guitar, Guitar (Rhythm)
Brian Doherty-Drums
Johnny Kick-Drums, Vocals (Background)
Adam Lasus-Engineer
Bradshaw Leigh-Mixing
Mary Lorson-Composer, Guitar, Vocals
James MacMillan-Engineer
Madder Rose-Primary Artist
Kevin Salem-Drum Programming, Drums, Engineer, Guest Artist, Producer
Matt Verta-Ray-Bass, Composer, Guitar (Rhythm), Slide Guitar, Vocals (Background)

References

1993 debut albums
Seed Records albums
Madder Rose albums